Tamboril may refer to:

Lophius piscatorius, a fish.
Tamboril, Dominican Republic
Tamboril, Ceará in Brazil
Tamboril do Piauí in Brazil
Tamboril (percussion), a snare drum that hangs from the player's belt and is played with two sticks.